Marc Dierickx (born 24 October 1954) is a former Belgian racing cyclist. He rode in six editions of the Tour de France between 1979 and 1984.

References

External links

1954 births
Living people
Belgian male cyclists
People from Temse
Cyclists from East Flanders